György Doros (2 April 1890 – 6 August 1945) was a Hungarian writer. His work was part of the literature event in the art competition at the 1932 Summer Olympics. As a member of the Nazi Party, Doros was not allowed to continue in his law practice after World War II and committed suicide by gas along with his wife. On 4 August 1939, the Council of Ministers awarded him the Cross of the Officer of the Hungarian Order of Merit for his services to international fencing. After World War II, he was banned from practicing law because of his support of the Arrow Cross Party - Hungarist Movement. On 6 August 1945, he committed suicide by gassing himself, together with his wife and was a member of the Hungarian Humanist Party and the Hungarian People's Party.

References

1890 births
1945 suicides
20th-century Hungarian male writers
Olympic competitors in art competitions
Place of birth missing
Suicides in Hungary
Suicides by gas
20th-century Hungarian lawyers
Joint suicides by Nazis
Hungarian Nazis